Socialist Youth of Galicia is the youth organisation of the Socialists' Party of Galicia (PSdeG). The first socialist youth groups appeared in the Galician cities between 1903 and 1904.

References

External links
Official website  

1903 establishments in Spain
Spanish Socialist Workers' Party
Youth wings of political parties in Spain
Youth wings of social democratic parties